Ricardo Rosales may refer to:

 Ricardo Rosales (footballer) (born 1993), Argentine midfielder
 Ricardo Rosales (politician) (1934–2020), Guatemalan politician